Okan Adil Kurt (born 11 January 1995) is a Turkish professional footballer who plays as a midfielder for Chemnitzer FC.

Career
Kurt made his 2. Bundesliga debut on 16 August 2013 against VfL Bochum replacing Christopher Buchtmann after 77 minutes during a 2–2 away draw.

References

External links
 
 
 

1995 births
Living people
Footballers from Hamburg
German people of Turkish descent
Turkish footballers
German footballers
Association football midfielders
Turkey youth international footballers
2. Bundesliga players
3. Liga players
Regionalliga players
Eerste Divisie players
FC St. Pauli players
Fortuna Sittard players
SC Fortuna Köln players
Chemnitzer FC players
Turkish expatriate footballers
German expatriate footballers
Turkish expatriate sportspeople in the Netherlands
German expatriate sportspeople in the Netherlands
Expatriate footballers in the Netherlands